The Raccoons on Ice is the second of four animated television specials leading up to the television series The Raccoons. It initially aired on CBC in Canada on December 20, 1981 and in syndication in the United States on November 21, 1982.

Plot
It is wintertime in the Evergreen Forest. At frozen Evergreen lake, everyone in the forest goes to ice skate and play hockey. Schaeffer, the old sheepdog, goes down to the lake, where he and his friends The Raccoons are playing hockey. Cedric Sneer is also at the rink, too, where he meets Sophia Tutu, a female aardvark figure skater who takes an interest in Cedric.

Cedric's father Cyril Sneer has sinister plans for Evergreen Lake - he plans on building his 'Cyril Dome' over the entire lake. But as Cyril and his construction crew are ready to build, the Raccoons and their friends stop them in their tracks. Bert proposes that the two warring sides should play a hockey game to determine who gets the lake. What agreed Cyril trains his Bears for the game and the Raccoons ask Cedric to play on their side, which Cedric agrees to. As they train, Cedric shows great hockey talent, but Cyril spies on the Raccoons and he is displeased with his son siding with the Raccoons. He grounds Cedric for a month and he also forbids Cedric from seeing Sophia (or "Sofa-girl" as Cyril nicknames her) ever again.

However the Raccoons and Schaeffer continue to practice. On the night before the game, the friends decide to sneak into Cyril Sneer's mansion to ask Cedric if he will play alongside them. Cedric is too scared of his father's wrath to rejoin them. A moment later, they are almost caught by Cyril, who claims he can hear other voices and angrily threatens his son not to go anywhere near the Raccoons again.

On the night of the game, Cyril's Bears are pummeling the Raccoons team by 3-0. After Bert injures his hand, Sophia finally persuades Cedric to help out. Masquerading as a "mystery player", Cedric manages to tie the game 3-3. Cyril finds out who the mystery player is, literally kicking his own son off the ice and threatening to lock him in the dungeon. The team considers giving up, but Bert refuses to give up so easily. The rest of the team are spurred on by Bert's courage and they go back onto the ice to continue. Bert manages to win the game for the team in the last few seconds, thus saving Evergreen Lake from Cyril's greed.

The next day, Julie, Tommy and their father arrive at the lake and find skate marks from the game. They're utterly puzzled as to who left them, as the humans were never aware of the threat posed to the lake, leaving Ranger Dan to curiously ask Tommy and Julie if they've "been playing any wild hockey games" lately.

Cast
The voice cast included:

 Len Carlson - Bert Raccoon
 Michael Magee - Cyril Sneer / Snag
 Bob Dermer - Ralph Raccoon / Bears
 Rita Coolidge - Melissa Raccoon
 Carl Banas - Schaeffer / Bears
 Fred Little - Cedric Sneer
 Sharon Lewis - Sophia Tutu
 Tammy Bourne - Julie
 Hadley Kay - Tommy
 Leo Sayer - Dan the Forest Ranger
 Danny Gallivan - Ferlin Fielddigger
 Rich Little - Narrator

Songs and performers
 Leo Sayer - "Taking My Time", "You Can Do It", "To Have You" (duet with Rita Coolidge)
 Rita Coolidge - "Some Days"

References

External links
 

1981 television films
1981 television specials
1980s animated television specials
1981 films
Canadian animated television films
English-language Canadian films
Canadian ice hockey films
Films about raccoons
The Raccoons
1980s Canadian films